The women's 50 metre freestyle S5 event at the 2012 Paralympic Games took place on 30 August, at the London Aquatics Centre.

Two heats were held, one with six swimmers and one with five swimmers. The swimmers with the eight fastest times advanced to the final.

Heats

Final

References

Swimming at the 2012 Summer Paralympics
2012 in women's swimming